The Theatre of the Golden Bough was located on Ocean Avenue in Carmel-by-the-Sea, California. This "Golden Bough" was one of two theaters in Carmel's history. It was destroyed by fire on May 19, 1935. Kuster moved his film operation to the older facility on Monte Verde Street, renamed it the Filmarte and it became the first "art house" between Los Angeles and San Francisco. It later became the Golden Bough Playhouse that still exists today.

History
The theatre was designed and built by Edward G. Kuster between 1922 and 1924. He hired Lee Gottfried to build it. It was located on the south side of Ocean Avenue between Lincoln Street and Monte Verde Street, with The Court of the Golden Bough in front. Kuster was a musician and lawyer from Los Angeles who relocated to Carmel to establish his own theatre and school. Kuster's wife built the Carmel Weavers Studio, with a ticket booth in front of the Golden Bough theatre.

In 1928, the Abalone League, a local amateur baseball club and active thespian group, bought the Carmel Arts and Crafts Hall from the Carmel Arts and Crafts Club and renamed it the Abalone Theatre, and later that year Kuster leased the Theatre of the Golden Bough to a local movie exhibitor, the Manzanita Theatre. Kuster then traveled to Europe for one year to study production techniques in Berlin and to negotiate for rights to produce English and European plays in the United States. In 1929, after returning from his European trip, Kuster leased the Theatre of the Golden Bough on Ocean Avenue to a movie theater chain for a period of five years. Kuster stipulated that the name "Golden Bough" could not be used for a movie house so it was renamed the Carmel Theatre.

Theatre fire

In 1935, Kuster renegotiated his lease with the movie tenants of the Theatre of the Golden Bough, to perform a stage play one weekend each month. On May 17, 1935, Kuster opened his production of the play By Candlelight. Two nights later, on May 19th, the original Theatre of the Golden Bough was destroyed by fire. Arson was the suspected cause of the blaze. 

Today, the Court of the Golden Bough flagstone courtyard still exits that once sourrounded the Golden Bough Theater's wood door entrance. Only the building facade emains. The entrance now opens to an arcade courtyard with shops behind a restaurant that was once known as Sade's. 

Kuster, who had previously bought out the Arts and Crafts Theatre, moved his film operation to the older facility on Monte Verde Street, renamed it the Filmarte and it became the first "art house" between Los Angeles and San Francisco. It later became the Golden Bough Playhouse.

References

 

Buildings and structures in Monterey County, California
Former theatres in the United States
Theatres in California
Event venues established in 1924
Carmel-by-the-Sea, California
1924 establishments in California
Burned theatres